Broughton Astley railway station was a railway station serving Broughton Astley in Leicestershire, England.

In 1844 the Midland Counties joined the North Midland Railway and the Birmingham and Derby Junction Railway to form the Midland Railway.

Originally named Broughton, the station was renamed several times: on 1 July 1845 it became Broughton Astley, reverting to the original name on 1 October 1870, but became Broughton Astley permanently from 15 September 1879.

British Railways closed the Leicester – Rugby line and its stations, including Broughton Astley which closed on 1 January 1962.

References

Railway stations in Great Britain opened in 1840
Railway stations in Great Britain closed in 1962
Former Midland Railway stations
Disused railway stations in Leicestershire
1840 establishments in England
Broughton Astley